or  is a village in Narvik Municipality in Nordland county, Norway. The village is located at the western end of the Ballangen fjord, a small branch off the main Ofotfjorden. The European route E06 highway runs through the village. It is the main north-south route in Northern Norway.

The village economy is centered around the government services for the municipality as well as some manufacturing industry. Just outside the village is Ballangen Museum, which presents the extensive mining activity that has been in Ballangen since the 17th century. The village was the administrative centre of the old municipality of Ballangen until 2020 when it was merged into Narvik.

References

Narvik
Villages in Nordland
Populated places of Arctic Norway